Mandardi is a small village located in the state of Gujarat in India.

Economy 
In this village 90% people are connect with farm. Near this village is a small river, Dhatarwadi.

Shree Navi Mandaradi primary school. In this school standard are 1 to 7.

Tourism

Temples 
In this village are the following temples:
 Radha krishna mandir
 Ramji mandir (work in progress)
 Shivji mandir (work in progress)
 Hanumanji mandir

References 

Cities and towns in Amreli district